is a Japanese professional footballer who plays as a defender. She currently play for Urawa Red Diamonds Ladies and the Japan national team.

References

External links

2003 births
Living people
Association football people from Akita Prefecture
Japanese women's footballers
Women's association football defenders
Japan women's international footballers
Urawa Red Diamonds Ladies players
WE League players